John Cardwell may refer to:
John Cardwell (American football) (1896–1979), American football player
John Cardwell (wrestler), American wrestler
John Cardwell (diplomat), American ambassador to Egypt in the 1880s
John Cardwell (racing driver), European racing driver